Planetárium Praha (in English: Prague Planetarium) is a planetarium located in Bubeneč, Prague, Czech Republic, next to the Stromovka park and Výstaviště Praha. Its dome is one of the largest in the world, measuring 23.5 m in a diameter. It was opened on November 20, 1960. It is equipped with both optomechanical and digital projectors.

The optomechanical Cosmorama, installed in 1991, is made by Carl Zeiss AG and it is the last still working device of this type. It is currently placed on moving arms in order to be able to hide and not to shadow a modern digital projection.

The digital projection system SkySkan Definiti installed in 2009 and modernized in 2014 has the highest resolution in Europe, its six Sony SRX T-615 projectors are capable to create an 8K picture.

The planetarium presents tens of prepared shows and is open every day except Fridays.

References

External links
 Official website

1960 establishments in Czechoslovakia
Buildings and structures completed in 1960
Planetaria in the Czech Republic
Buildings and structures in Prague
Tourist attractions in Prague
20th-century architecture in the Czech Republic